Globe Life Insurance Company of New York, based in Syracuse, New York, is a subsidiary of United American Insurance Company (UA). The company is a subsidiary of Globe Life (NYSE: GL), based in McKinney, Texas.

History
In 1981, as United American, the company became a member of Globe Life, a financial services holding company, listed on the New York Stock Exchange (NYSE: GL).United American was chartered that year as a result of their business spreading across the United States.  United American was chartered that year as a result of their business spreading across the United States. First UA wrote its first piece of business in 1986.

In 2011, First United American has earned the A+ (Superior) Financial Rating from A.M. Best Company. It was downgraded to A (Excellent) in 2020.

In 2019, Globe Life Insurance Company of New York has entered into a contract with the Department of Financial Services in the state. Torchmark Corporation is a subsidiary of Globe Life. Globe Life must pay a fine of $439,000, in addition to the restitution of over $7.3 million which it has agreed to pay to the beneficiaries.

References

Insurance companies based in New York (state)
Life insurance companies of the United States
Financial services companies established in 1981
Companies based in Syracuse, New York
Globe Life Subsidiaries